The Kelowna Memorial Arena is an ice hockey arena located in Kelowna, British Columbia. It was built in 1945 and has a capacity of 2,600. It is notable for its small ice surface of 180' X 80'. It once hosted the Western Hockey League's Kelowna Wings and the Kelowna Rockets before they moved into the new Prospera Place. The arena also hosted the Kelowna Spartans of the BCJHL, who won the Centennial Cup in 1993. The old arena still stands and is used for Kelowna Minor Hockey, and the Okanagan College Hockey League.

Built with the memorial fund given to the city due to World War II, there is a war museum connected to the arena.
The "Memorial Arena" is the centre of Downtown Kelowna, right beside Okanagan Lake.

Indoor arenas in British Columbia
Indoor ice hockey venues in Canada
Sports venues in Kelowna
Western Hockey League arenas
1945 establishments in British Columbia
Sports venues completed in 1945